Carcès is a commune in the Var department in the Provence-Alpes-Côte d'Azur region in southeastern France.

Inhabitants are known in French as Carçois and Carcoiçes.

See also
Communes of the Var department

References

External links
 History, ecard, upcoming program
 Official Town Hall (only in French)  
 WebSite in French

Communes of Var (department)